The 1954 winners of the Torneo di Viareggio (in English, the Viareggio Tournament, officially the Viareggio Cup World Football Tournament Coppa Carnevale), the annual youth football tournament held in Viareggio, Tuscany, are listed below.

Format
The 16 teams are organized in knockout rounds, all played single tie.

Participating teams

Italian teams

  Fiorentina
  Juventus
  Lanerossi Vicenza
  Milan
  Roma
  Sampdoria
  Udinese
  Viareggio

European teams

  Austria Wien
  Chiasso
  Offenbach
  SUED Madrid
  Real Madrid
  Odense
  Landskrona
  Stade de Reims

Tournament fixtures

Champions

Footnotes

External links
 Official Site (Italian)
 Results on RSSSF.com

1954
1953–54 in Italian football
1953–54 in French football
1953–54 in Yugoslav football
1953–54 in Austrian football
1953–54 in German football
1953–54 in Swiss football
1953–54 in Spanish football
1953–54 in Swedish football
1953–54 in Danish football